Etterna is the second album from French soprano Emma Shapplin. The album was produced by film composer Graeme Revell and includes collaborations with the London Symphony Orchestra. It received a gold certification in Greece.
All songs written and composed by Emma Shapplin:

Track listing

Bonus DVD

Charts

Weekly charts

Year-end charts

References

External links
Official site

Emma Shapplin albums
2002 albums
Italian-language albums
London Symphony Orchestra